Tu cara me suena is an American Spanish-language reality television series that premiered on Univision on October 4, 2020. It is based on both the Endemol format Your Face Sounds Familiar and an adaptation of the Spanish Tu cara me suena. The show is hosted by actress Ana Brenda Contreras, alongside Rafael Araneda.

The series has been renewed for a second season that premiered on March 27, 2022, airing simultaneously on Univision and Las Estrellas.

Format 
Eight celebrities will compete in a song and dance number while impersonating iconic singers. Each week, the "Randomizer" will assign the artists of whom they will impersonate. When the randomizer is pressed, the icon the contestant is assigned will be shown, along with a preview of the song they have to perform. The judges award points to each performance and celebrities can also give points to fellow participants. The celebrity with the most points will be declared the winner of the night and receive a prize for the charity they represent. The winner of the season will receive the biggest prize for their charity.

Cast

Cast timeline
Color key:

Series overview

Ratings 
 

| link2             = Tu cara me suena (American season 2)
| episodes2         = 7
| start2            = 
| end2              = 
| startrating2      = 1.40
| endrating2        = 1.40
| viewers2          = |2}} 
}}

References 

2020s American reality television series
2020 American television series debuts
Univision original programming
Television series by Endemol
Spanish-language television shows
Your Face Sounds Familiar
Television productions suspended due to the COVID-19 pandemic